The City of London Corporation elections occur regularly to provide the elected representatives who run the City of London Corporation.

There are 25 wards in the City of London which are represented on the Court of Common Council by an Alderman and a number of Common Councilmen. The electors of the ward are registered annually with forms being sent to all residents and businesses in the City. This enables the registered voters to vote on the relevant ward list. In March 2013 there were 12,479 business votes and 6,504 residential votes. Also only 27 per cent of the electorate were women.

Ward elections
Common Council elections take place every four years. Aldermanic elections take place every six years.

Wardmote
All registered voters are invited to a wardmote. Where the number of candidates nominated equals the number of vacant places, those candidates are automatically returned. Nevertheless, a wardmote is held, where the voters of the ward can meet and question the candidates. If a poll is required it is held at this meeting.

Sheriff elections
The City of London has two sheriffs, the Aldermanic Sheriff and the Non-Aldermanic Sheriff. They are both elected by the "Livery assembled in Common Hall" around Midsummers day.

Leadership
The role of Lord Mayor of London is largely ceremonial. Political leadership on the corporation is instead provided by the chair of the policy and resources committee (also known as the policy chairman), who is sometimes described as the "de facto political leader". The policy chairman represents the City on the leaders' committee of London Councils, alongside the leaders of the 32 London Boroughs.

Since 1984, the policy chairmen have been:

Recent years
 2009 City of London Corporation election
 2013 City of London Corporation election
 2017 City of London Corporation election
 2022 City of London Corporation election

References